Paraxiphodon is an extinct genus of Artiodactyl (family Xiphodontidae) from the Late Eocene of France (Robiac-Nord and Fons). There are two included species, P. teulonensis and P. cournovensis. The genus demonstrated the continued existence of xiphodonts into at least the Lower Oligocene.

References 

Tylopoda
Eocene even-toed ungulates
Priabonian life
Eocene mammals of Europe
Paleogene France
Fossils of France
Fossil taxa described in 1978
Prehistoric even-toed ungulate genera